Young Widder Brown was a daytime radio drama series broadcast on NBC from 1938 to 1956. Sponsored by Sterling Drugs and Bayer Aspirin, it daily examined the life of "attractive Ellen Brown, with two fatherless children to support."

The convoluted storyline focused on the efforts of Ellen, in her early thirties, to bring up her two children in the small town of Simpsonville, West Virginia, where she supported herself by running a tearoom, despite continual tragedies in her life. (Another source refers to Simpsonville as "a small Midwestern town.")

Produced by Frank and Anne Hummert, this soap opera series opened with the theme music "In the Gloaming" as rendered by organist John Winters. Heard in the title role during the 18-year run were Florence Freeman (1938–54) and Wendy Drew (1954–56). Ellen Brown was romanced by Peter Turner (Bud Collyer) and Anthony Loring (Ned Wever). Ellen's children were Janey (Marilyn Erskine) and Mark (Tommy Donnelly).

Directors for the series included Martha Atwell, Richard Leonard and Ed Slattery. The announcer was George Ansbro.

See also
List of radio soaps

References

American radio soap operas
1930s American radio programs
1940s American radio programs
1950s American radio programs
NBC radio programs